A list of films produced in Russia in 2008 (see 2008 in film).

2008

See also
 2008 in Russia

References

External links
 Russian films of 2008 at the Internet Movie Database

2008
Russia
Films